is a village located in Fukushima Prefecture, Japan. , the village had an estimated population of 3,051 in 924 households, and a population density of 190 persons per km2. The total area of the village was ..

Geography
Yugawa is located in the northern portion of the Aizu region of Fukushima Prefecture, in center of the Aizu Basin.

Rivers : Nippashi River, Agakawa River

Neighboring municipalities
Fukushima Prefecture
Aizuwakamatsu
Kitakata
Aizubange

Demographics
Per Japanese census data, the population of Yugawa has declined steadily over the past 70 years.

Climate
Yugawa has a Humid continental climate (Köppen Dfb) characterized by warm summers and cold winters with heavy snowfall.  The average annual temperature in Yugawa is 11.9 °C. The average annual rainfall is 1383 mm with September as the wettest month. The temperatures are highest on average in August, at around 25.6 °C, and lowest in January, at around -0.8 °C.

History
The area of present-day Yugawa was part of ancient Mutsu Province. During the early Heian period, the Buddhist temple of Shōjō-ji was founded in what is now part of Yugawa village. The area formed part of the holdings of Aizu Domain during the Edo period. After the Meiji Restoration, the area was organized as part of Kawanuma District. Fukushima Prefecture. The villages of Oikawa and Shōjō were created with the establishment of the modern municipalities system on April 1, 1889.  These villages merged to form Yugawa on March 31, 1957.

Economy
The economy of Yugawa is centered on the production of rice, with much of the town area under paddy fields. Asparagus is also a major cash crop.

Education
Yugawa has two public elementary schools and one public junior high school operated by the village government. The village does not have a high school.

Transportation

Railway
 JR East – Ban'etsu West Line

Highway

Local attractions

Shōjō-ji – Buddhist temple with Important Cultural Property buildings and National Treasure sculptures.

References

External links

Official Website 

 
Villages in Fukushima Prefecture